Molendoa ogalalensis is a species of moss in the Pottiaceae family. It is endemic to the United States.  Its natural habitat is temperate grassland. It is threatened by habitat loss.

References

Flora of the United States
Pottiaceae
Critically endangered plants
Taxonomy articles created by Polbot
Taxobox binomials not recognized by IUCN